The Stern ST 87 Vega (sometimes ST-87) is a French homebuilt aircraft that was designed by Rene Stern, first flying in July 1992. The aircraft is supplied in the form of plans for amateur construction.

Design and development
The ST 87 Vega features a cantilever low-wing, a two-seats-in-side-by-side configuration enclosed cockpit under a bubble canopy, fixed conventional landing gear with wheel pants and a single engine in tractor configuration.

The aircraft is made from wood, with its flying surfaces covered in doped aircraft fabric.

The manufacturer estimates the construction time from the supplied kit as 2000 hours.

Operational history
By 1998 the company reported that four kits had been sold and two aircraft were completed and flying.

Specifications (ST 87 Vega)

References

External links

Photo of a Stern ST 87 Vega

ST 87 Vega
1990s French sport aircraft
1990s French ultralight aircraft
1990s French civil utility aircraft
Single-engined tractor aircraft
Low-wing aircraft
Homebuilt aircraft
Aircraft first flown in 1992